Edward Jones (born 17 September 1952) is an English former professional footballer who played in the Football League, as a defender.

In July 1979, Jones joined Cray Wanderers, staying for two successful seasons during which Cray became champions of the Kent League.

References

Sources

1952 births
Living people
Footballers from Finchley
English footballers
Association football defenders
Tottenham Hotspur F.C. players
Millwall F.C. players
Dartford F.C. players
English Football League players
Cray Wanderers F.C. players